Pepperoni Quattro is the third full-length album released by the Japanese music group Ellegarden. It was released on May 26, 2004.

Track listing
Supernova - 3:45
Starfish (スターフィッシュ) - 3:41
Make a Wish - 2:18
Addicted - 3:16
Butterfly (バタフライ) - 3:10
My Bloody Holiday - 2:36
Pizza Man - 2:09
Lost World (ロストワールド) - 3:17
Perfect Days - 3:26
Good Morning Kids - 3:40

Charts

References

Ellegarden albums
2004 albums